Primula prolifera, the candelabra primrose or glory of the bog, is a flowering plant in the family Primulaceae. Its botanical name is currently unresolved.

In cultivation it has won the Royal Horticultural Society's Award of Garden Merit.

Description
The spoon-shaped, simple leaves are arranged in a basal rosette. The golden yellow, fragrant flowers are borne in whorls, measuring 2.5  cm across.

Range
Primula prolifera is found in a range from the eastern Himalayas to Indonesia.

References

prolifera